Takeshi Utsumi is a dedicated former Fulbright Scholar who has, for some decades, devoted himself to experimenting with and demonstrating the technology that can bring needed learning, health care and perhaps "peace to everyone on our planet."  He is the founder and vice president for "Technology and Coordination" of the Global University System, and is the co-editor of a new book about that project, Global Peace Through The Global University System. The book has been published at the University of Tampere in Finland.

Because of his belief that the spread of education is essential for ultimate global peace, Utsumi decided to find people with similar thoughts and to spread these beliefs. Beginning as an individual, Utsumi built an e-mail network from the "bottom-up" of people who share the dream. These people then began to join him in experiments and demonstrations of possibilities for using information technologies to bring affordable, essential learning to those parts of the developing world that have been difficult to reach.

Peace gaming is a neologism coined by Utsumi to describe non-military global simulations, or simulations that involve both military and civilian variables.

Sources
 Rossman, Parker (September 17, 2004).  "Interview with Takeshi Utsumi".  Retrieved Aug. 27, 2006.

See also
Peace gaming

External links
"Globally Collaborative Environmental Peace Gaming", Utsumi's paper (last revised in 2003) describing the concept.

GLOSAS web site

Year of birth missing (living people)
Living people
American people of Japanese descent
American operations researchers